The 1944–45 Ranji Trophy was the 11th season of the Ranji Trophy. Bombay won the title defeating Holkar in the final.

Highlights
Rusi Modi of Bombay scored 1008 runs in the season. He played five matches and averaged 201.60. No other batsman would score even 900 in a season until W. V. Raman made 1018 runs in 1988–89 by which time teams played more matches.
Modi scored hundreds in each of the five matches. His scores were 160, 210, 245* & 31*, 113 and 98 & 151 in the final. He had scored 168 and 128 in the last two matches of the 1943-44 season, thus scoring hundreds in five consecutive innings and seven consecutive matches in Ranji Trophy.
Modi's five centuries in a season was another record. As of 2021, only V. V. S. Laxman (eight hundreds in 1999–00), Kedar Jadhav (six in 2013–14) and Milind Kumar (six in 2018–19) have made more hundreds in a season.

C. S. Nayudu of Holkar bowled 917 balls in the final, a record in all first class cricket.

Zonal Matches

West Zone

North Zone

East Zone

South Zone

Inter-Zonal Knockout matches

Final

Scorecards and averages
Cricketarchive

References

External links
 

1945 in Indian cricket
Indian domestic cricket competitions